Nine is the eighth  studio album by American rock band Blink-182, released on September 20, 2019, through Columbia Records, as the band's first album on the label. The band began developing the album after fulfilling touring obligations for their previous release, California (2016). While Nine builds upon their collaboration with producer John Feldmann, who also produced California, it also utilizes additional outside producers and songwriters including Captain Cuts, the Futuristics, and Tim Pagnotta. Nine is the band's second and final album to feature guitarist/vocalist Matt Skiba before the return of founding member Tom DeLonge in 2022.

Although Nine is sequentially Blink-182's eighth studio album, Hoppus and Barker decided to consider it their ninth by retroactively counting the band's 1994 demo, Buddha, as their first. Hoppus also cited the significance of the number 9 as "the number of universal love, and the number of Uranus." The color wash album cover was painted by graffiti artist RISK. Much of the album's lyricism is dark in nature and was informed by world events, as well as Hoppus' battle with depression. Musically, the album augments the band's pop-punk sound with hip hop-inspired programming as well as electronics. For Nine, the trio moved from independent service BMG to major label Columbia.

Nine received generally positive reviews from music critics, many of whom complimented its upgrade to the band's signature sound as well as its moodier lyrical content. It debuted at number three on the Billboard 200 domestically; it reached the top ten in Canada, Austria, Australia, Germany, and the United Kingdom as well. The band promoted the album with a North American co-headlining tour with rapper Lil Wayne, as well as five singles, including "I Really Wish I Hated You", which reached the top five on Billboard Hot Rock Songs chart.

Background
From 2016 to 2018, Blink-182 toured extensively in support of their previous album, California. After touring concluded, Skiba and Barker took time off from the band in order to focus on other projects. Skiba returned to Alkaline Trio to record their 2018 album, Is This Thing Cursed?, and tour in support of it, while Barker focused his energies on multiple different projects, including collaborations with Yungblud, Machine Gun Kelly, Suicideboys, XXXTentacion, and Lil Nas X. Hoppus, however, fell into a depression. Band manager Gus Brandt became concerned, as did Hoppus' wife, Skye. She implored him to focus on activities that made him feel happiest, which for him were writing and playing music. He decided upon the idea of fronting a solo album, with guest spots from familiar faces he had worked with over the years. His first call went to All Time Low vocalist/guitarist Alex Gaskarth, and their studio sessions evolved into Simple Creatures, a full-fledged side project. The duo released their first two extended plays, Strange Love and Everything Opposite, in 2019.

Recording and production

The band first began recording new music in April 2018, with the band members posting photos and videos to their respective social media accounts. The band continued collaborating with producer John Feldmann, as well as recording at their personal home studios. The trio recorded over 30 songs, largely in the same pop-punk vein as California. Midway through the process, the band became concerned the material felt too familiar and predictable. Barker was the first to voice concern, joking that it sounded like California 2: Electric Boogaloo. Hoppus and Skiba concurred, with Skiba later offering that the songs weren't "new or exciting." The band decided to start over, and continued their work with outside songwriters. Hoppus likened the approach to a blind date, as prior to the sessions, the band members and producers/songwriters had yet to meet.

During the recording process for Nine, the band worked with several artists, among them Pharrell Williams, The Futuristics, Captain Cuts, Andrew Watt, and Tim Pagnotta, with whom they wrote the singles "Blame It on My Youth" and "Happy Days". The latter two were written as the group became concerned the album was too lyrically dark and lacked positive songs. Much of the new songs were built around Barker's drum beats, rather than guitar melodies. For Skiba, the unity of the band during the recording process helped solidify their friendships. "I now know my place better in Blink than I did years ago. We're always learning," he said. Musically, Nine infuses hip hop-inspired programming, electronics, and modern recording techniques into the band's punk rock sound. "Making sure Blink isn't different than modern music — rather than being something of the past — is a big achievement for me," Barker said shortly before the album's release. Steve Appleford of the Los Angeles Times describes the album as containing "postmodern effects and accelerated beats mingling with Blink-style vocal harmonies."

Composition

Nine is considered a pop-punk and pop rock album. Lyrical subject matter on the album is largely dark in tone, frequently focusing on self-doubt and isolation. Christian Allaire of Vogue called it an album that focuses on "healing—from depression, anxiety, failed relationships, a broken political system." Many conversations with their outside songwriters began with discussing their worst fears and building a song around it. Hoppus hoped to capture more honesty in his songwriting, and as such, much of Nine is inspired by his battle with depression. "My brain naturally goes in cycles to dark places and I have to actively combat that," he told Matt Allen of Kerrang!. "I'm not in a place right now where I want to write happy, up-tempo songs." He turned to exercise as a method of countering the negative thoughts, as well as spending more time outdoors and reading books. He also struggled with his confidence: "I wake up every day like, 'I'm never going to write another good song,'" he said. Hoppus noted to Allen that a compulsion to check his phone and scroll on Twitter impacted his daily thoughts:

"It's a really strange time where everyone is on heightened alert," he said. "I wake up and look at Twitter, I get angry, and I start my day. It's unhealthy to live with this level of anger. I have to consciously make an effort to not look at the news a lot of the time and just say, 'Every single day there's some new outrage and a lot of the time it's not worth my time.' [...] The way everything is wired right now — between the news, and Twitter, and social media — everything spins so quickly that there's no time to take a breath."

In addition, world events—the presidency of Donald Trump, his border control policies, and the influx of mass shootings in the U.S.—were infused into Nine. Specifically, "Heaven" was written about a massacre at a bar in Thousand Oaks that took place just shy of two miles from Barker's California home in 2018. Other songs, such as "Black Rain", center on concepts of faith. Feldmann first sketched out the song as an uplifting embrace of salvation, but Skiba altered it to serve as a critique of organized religion. He had recently viewed the film Spotlight, and its investigation into the known abuses of children at the hands of the Catholic Church instilled a rage in him. "I took John's hopeful, churchy idea and painted it black [...] I have zero faith for the business of fear and war-mongering," he said. There are also multiple references throughout the album to using alcohol for self-medicative purposes. Hoppus noted to Allen that he and Skiba were not completely sober, and that the lyrical references capture his belief that "the world is looking for something to take the edge off, whether that be drinking or taking pills."

Artwork and title
Barker was in charge of developing the artwork, as he had been on previous releases. He picked from four of his favorite artists, with the renowned graffiti artist RISK delivering the final artwork. His goal as an artist is to evoke emotion with color in an abstract sense, and to achieve this, he often uses the color wash technique. RISK calls this treatment "Beautiful Destruction", and everyone in the band loved his pieces enough to use for the album cover.

While in production, the band often referred to the album with the joke title Bojmir—or rim job backwards. Shortly after the album's announcement, Hoppus posted the meaning of the album's name on Reddit, stating that it is their ninth album. While Blink-182 had only released seven official studio albums prior to Nine, Hoppus also included their demo album, Buddha, as an official album:

NINE. This is our ninth album, as decided by me and Travis. Some count Buddha, some not. Some count The Mark, Tom and Travis Show. Some count Greatest Hits. Some count Dogs Eating Dogs. I'm counting Buddha, Cheshire Cat, Dude Ranch, Enema of the State, TOYPAJ, Untitled, Neighborhoods, California, and now Nine. Nine is also the number of universal love, and the number of Uranus.

Release

The band announced a 2019 headlining tour with rapper Lil Wayne on May 6, 2019 in support of the forthcoming album. Two days later, the trio released the lead single "Blame It on My Youth" with a lyric video online featuring Risk spray-painting the song's lyrics on a wall in a time lapse. The trio previewed an additional three songs prior to the album's release; "Generational Divide" was released on June 21, as was its accompanying music video, with "Happy Days" following on July 1. "Darkside" continued the pre-release strategy on July 26, with its official music video premiering on August 28.
In addition, the group released “I Really Wish I Hated You” as the fifth and final single for the album on September 6.

The band started a text messaging newsletter in the days leading up to the release of the "Darkside" single, and has since updated it with previews of songs and links to new videos.  The number could also be called to be greeted with a fifteen-second preview of "Darkside" as the answering machine.

The band announced Nine on July 25, 2019.

Critical reception

Nine received generally positive reviews from music critics. At Metacritic, which assigns a normalized rating out of 100 to reviews from mainstream critics, the album has an average score of 67 out of 100, indicating "generally favorable reviews" based on ten reviews. AllMusic contributor Neil Z. Yeung considered it one of Blink's "strongest late-era efforts," praising its "commitment to vulnerability and honesty." Nick Catucci of Rolling Stone found it to be an "excellent album," commending the trio's self-awareness and maturity. Spencer Kornhaber of The Atlantic described its sound as "high-grade [and] ultra-processed", albeit "very, very catchy."

Many critics favorably compared Nine to the band's 2003 untitled effort. Ali Shutler of NME called it the "spiritual follow-up" to that LP, and said Nine showcases the band "back at their very best." Tom Shepherd at Kerrang! extolled the material's "rich personality", while Collin Goeman of Alternative Press dubbed it a "pop-punk record for the next generation."

Exclaim! Adam Feibel wrote a more negative review of Nine, heavily criticizing the album's adolescent themes. "Hoppus can't decide if he's writing for the kids or as a kid, churning out corny, melodramatic musings ripped from a high-school diary." Grant Sharples of online magazine Consequence of Sound felt the LP was "weighed down by stereotypical lyrics and cloying choruses." Nathan Smith at Pitchfork considered it "surprising how well the new sound works," but also "half as fun as the band used to be."

Loudwire named it one of the 50 best rock albums of 2019.

Commercial performance
Nine debuted at number three on the US Billboard 200 with 94,000 album-equivalent units, including 77,000 pure album sales. To date it has sold over 202,000 copies worldwide and is the band's eighth US top 10 album. Nine debuted at number one on the US Rock Albums, US Alternative Albums, US Tastemakers Albums and US Vinyl Albums.

Track listing
Adapted from Apple Music. 

Notes
  signifies an additional producer

Personnel
Credits adapted from the album's liner notes.

Locations
Recorded at Opra Studios and Rancho Pagzilla (North Hollywood, California); Foxy Studios (Los Angeles, California); Studio 1111 (Beverly Hills, California)
Mixed at The Casita (Hollywood, California); Lotus Eater Studio (Santa Monica, California); Larrabee Sound Studios (North Hollywood, California); MOON Studios (Burbank, California); SARM Studios (London, England); MixStar Studios (Virginia Beach, Virginia)
Mastered at Chris Athens Masters (Austin, Texas); "I Really Wish I Hated You" mastered at The Mastering Place (New York City)

Personnel

Blink-182
Matt Skiba – vocals, guitars
Mark Hoppus – vocals, bass guitar
Travis Barker – drums, percussion, programming and piano (3, 11, 14–15), producer (13)

Additional musicians
Alex Schwartz – songwriting (10), additional production (13)
Ali Tamposi – songwriting (9)
Andrew Watt – producer (9), songwriting (9), instrumentation and programming (9), guitar (9), vocals (9)
Benjamin Berger – songwriting (6)
Brian Phillips – additional production and engineering (5), gang vocals (5)
Chris Greatti – songwriting (3)
Happy Perez – additional production (9), instrumentation and programming (9), guitar (9)
Ian Walsh – programming and digital editing (5)
Jake Torrey – songwriting (10)
Jaramye Daniels – songwriting (15)
Jim Lavigne – songwriting (1, 14)
Joe Khajadourian – songwriting (10), additional production (13)
John Mitchell – songwriting (1, 7, 14)
JP Clark – songwriting (15)
Matt Malpass – producer (13), songwriting (2, 5, 11), additional production and engineering (5)
Ryan McMahon – songwriting (6)
Ryan Rabin – songwriting (6)
Sam Hollander – songwriting (2, 5), gang vocals (5)

Design
Chris Feldmann – art direction, design
Mark Rubbo – CGI and neon design
RISK – mural, track listing titles
Sacha Waldman – mural photography

Production
Allison McGregor – booking
Andrew "Schwifty" Luftman – production coordinator (9)
Anna Maslowitz – publicity (Europe)
Bo Gardner – business management
Chris Athens – mastering (1–8, 10–15)
Chris Galland – mix engineer (5)
Daniel Jensen – crew
Darian Polich – crew
Darryl Eaton – booking
Dave Kutch – mastering (9)
David "Dsilb" Silberstein – production coordinator (9)
Drew "Grey Poupon" Salamunovich – production coordinator (9)
Dylan McLean – engineer (1, 3–4, 6–15), additional mixing (6, 12)
Greg Johnson – A&R, album supervisor
Gus Brandt – management
Jake Lowry – management
Jennifer Weisman-Voale – publicity (North America)
Jeremy "Jboogs" Levin – production coordinator (9)
John Feldmann – producer and songwriting (1, 3–4, 6–12, 14–15), instrumentation and programming (9), guitar (9)
John Hanes – mix engineer (9)
Kevin Wolff – management
KI Pipal – mixing assistant (6)
Lawrence Vavra – management
Leslie Frank – legal
Lisa Socransky Austin – legal
Manny Marroquin – mixing (5)
Michael Bono – assisting recording engineer (3, 7, 10, 14–15)
Mike Dewdney – booking
Mo Green – booking
Neal Avron – mixing (1–3, 8)
Nik Tretiakov – assistant engineer (12–13)
Peter Paterno – legal
Rich Costey – mixing (4, 6–7, 10–11, 14)
Robert Ortiz – crew
Robin Florent – assistant engineer (5)
Samantha Corrie "SamCor" Schulman – production coordinator (9)
Sarah "Goodie Bag" Shelton – production coordinator (9)
Scot Stewart – engineer (1, 3–4, 6–15), additional mixing (6, 12)
Scott Desmarias – assistant (5)
Serban Ghenea – mixing (9)
Tim Pagnotta – producer (2, 5), songwriting (2, 5), gang vocals (5)
Zakk Cervini – mixing (12–13)
Zvi "Angry Beard Man" Edelman – production coordinator (9)

Charts

Weekly charts

Year-end charts

References

Footnotes

Sources

External links
 

2019 albums
Blink-182 albums
Albums produced by Andrew Watt (record producer)
Columbia Records albums